Bernard Clare is a 1946 novel by James T. Farrell.

References 

 
 Book Review Digest 1946

1946 novels
English-language books
Vanguard Press books
Works about Sacco and Vanzetti